Acanthinozodium is a genus of spiders in the family Zodariidae.

Species
 it contains twenty-three species and one subspecies:

Acanthinozodium ansieae Jocqué & van Harten, 2015 – Yemen (Socotra)
Acanthinozodium armita Zamani & Marusik, 2021 – Iran
Acanthinozodium atrisa Zamani & Marusik, 2021 – Iran
Acanthinozodium cirrisulcatum Denis, 1952 – Mauritania, Morocco
Acanthinozodium cirrisulcatum longispina Denis, 1952 – Morocco
Acanthinozodium crateriferum Jocqué & Henrard, 2015 – Ethiopia
Acanthinozodium diara Zamani & Marusik, 2021 – Iran
Acanthinozodium dorsa Zamani & Marusik, 2021 – Iran
Acanthinozodium elburzicum Zamani & Marusik, 2021 – Iran
Acanthinozodium kiana Zamani & Marusik, 2021 – Iran
Acanthinozodium masa Zamani & Marusik, 2021 – Iran
Acanthinozodium niusha Zamani & Marusik, 2021 – Iran
Acanthinozodium ovtchinnikovi Zamani & Marusik, 2021 – Turkmenistan
Acanthinozodium parmida Zamani & Marusik, 2021 – Iran
Acanthinozodium parysatis Zamani & Marusik, 2021 – Iran
Acanthinozodium quercicola Jocqué & Henrard, 2015 – Morocco
Acanthinozodium sahariense Denis, 1959 – Algeria
Acanthinozodium sahelense Jocqué & Henrard, 2015 – Senegal, Ivory Coast, Burkina Faso, Cameroon
Acanthinozodium sericeum Denis, 1956 – Morocco
Acanthinozodium sorani Zamani & Marusik, 2021 – Iran
Acanthinozodium spinulosum Denis, 1966 (type) – Libya
Acanthinozodium subclavatum Denis, 1952 – Morocco
Acanthinozodium tibesti Jocqué, 1991 – Chad
Acanthinozodium zavattarii (Caporiacco, 1941) – Ethiopia

References

Zodariidae
Araneomorphae genera
Spiders of Africa